Yum Yum Donut Shops, Inc. , doing business as Yum Yum Donuts, is an American donut shop chain based in California. As of 2021, there are 71 stores, all located in California.

History 
Phillip C. Holland founded Yum Yum Donuts in 1971 in a former Orange Julius store. The original location, at Avenue 26 and Figueroa Street in the Cypress Park district of Los Angeles, California is still in operation. Holland met his future business partner, Frank Watase, when he put out a newspaper advertisement seeking a business manager for his first shop. Holland expanded to three shops by 1973, sold half of the company to Watase, and together, they went on to open over 100 stores. In 1989, Holland retired and sold his share of the company to Watase, who owned and operated the company with his son, Lincoln Watase.

In 2004 Yum-Yum Donuts bought Winchell's Donuts which opened 70 donuts shops ready for operation. As of 2019, there were 126 Winchell's and Yum-Yum Donuts shops in the greater Los Angeles area. Yum-Yum Donuts is the largest chain of privately owned donut shops in the United States. Both Yum-Yum Donuts and Winchell's are headquartered in the City of Industry, California.

Frank Watase died in September 2020 and, today, his son Lincoln Watase remains President of Yum-Yum Donuts.

See also 
 List of doughnut shops

References

External links 
 

Restaurants established in 1971
Doughnut shops
Fast-food chains of the United States
Bakeries of the United States
Regional restaurant chains in the United States
Companies based in the City of Industry, California
1971 establishments in California